Timex may refer to:

 Timex Group USA, watch manufacturer, now owned by Timex Group
 Timex Group, Dutch holding company, owner of several watch brands
 Timex Audio, brand name licensed to SDI Technologies
 Timex Sinclair, computer manufacturer
 Timex Social Club, American R&B music group